The Laughing Husband (German:Der lachende Ehemann) is a 1926 German silent film directed by Rudolf Walther-Fein and Rudolf Dworsky and starring Livio Pavanelli, Elisabeth Pinajeff and Hans Albers. It is based on the operetta of the same name by Edmund Eysler.

The film's art direction was by Hans Minzloff and Jacek Rotmil.

Cast
 Livio Pavanelli as Ottokar Bruckner  
 Elisabeth Pinajeff as Hella, Bruckners Ehefrau  
 Hans Albers as Graf Balthasar Selztal  
 Paul Heidemann as Max Basewitz  
 Vivian Gibson as Etelka, die gechiedene Frau von Basewitz  
 Max Hansen as Hans, frischgebackener Ehemann  
 Charlotte Ander as Dolly, frischgebackene Ehefrau 
 Carl Auen as Dr. Rosenroth, Lawyer
 Hermann Picha as Bürovorsteher

References

Bibliography
 Bock, Hans-Michael & Bergfelder, Tim. The Concise CineGraph. Encyclopedia of German Cinema. Berghahn Books, 2009.

External links

1926 films
Films of the Weimar Republic
Films directed by Rudolf Dworsky
Films directed by Rudolf Walther-Fein
German silent feature films
Films based on operettas
German black-and-white films